The 43d Air Division is an inactive unit of the United States Air Force.  It was last active on 1 October 1957, when it was stationed at Itazuke Air Base, Japan

History
Originally designated as the 43d Air Division (Defense) when organized on 1 March 1952, the division was redesignated 43d Air Division on 18 March 1955. The unit was discontinued and inactivated, on 1 October 1957.  The 43d Air Division assumed responsibility for the air defense of Southwestern Japan (Kyūshū, in March 1952. The 43d also included the western part of Honshū, and most of Shikoku), using radar, fighter aircraft, and ground weapons to prevent or disrupt enemy air attacks. "It supported numerous exercises, some involving U.S. and British naval vessels, and training for the Japan Air Self Defense Force. The division also supervised electronic countermeasures, and weather reconnaissance missions. In the summer of 1957, when the Nagasaki area suffered severe flooding, the 43d assisted Japanese authorities and people by flying numerous airlift missions with helicopters and fixed-wing aircraft."

Lineage
 Established as the 43d Air Division (Defense) and organized on 1 March 1952
 Redesignated 43d Air Division on 18 March 1955
 Discontinued and inactivated on 1 October 1957

Assignments
 Japan Air Defense Force, 1 March 1952;
 Fifth Air Force, 1 September 1954 – 1 October 1957

Components
Wings
 8th Fighter-Bomber Wing: 1 March 1955 – 1 October 1957

Squadrons
 68th Fighter-Interceptor Squadron: 1 March 1955 – 1 October 1957

Aircraft
 Lockheed F-94 Starfire (1952–1953)
 North American F-86 Sabre (1953–1957)
 North American F-100 Super Sabre (1957)

Commanders
 Col. Charles W. Stark, 1 March 1952
 Col. Edward N. Backus, c.1954
 Col. Samuel J. Gormly Jr., by 31 December 1954
 Col. James M. Smelley, 9 July 1956
 Col. Ladson G. Eskridge Jr., 13 August 1956 – 1 October 1957

See also
 Fifth Air Force
 List of United States Air Force air divisions

References

Notes

Bibliography

 

043